Gonatotrichus is a genus of millipedes in the order Siphonophorida, described in 1951 by Carl Attems. Two species are known, G. minutus from Malacca, Malaysia, and G. silhouettensis from Seychelles.

References

Siphonophorida
Millipedes of Africa